The Basilica of St. Ferjeux is situated in Besançon, in the quartier of Saint-Ferjeux.  It is dedicated to the patron saints of Besançon, Ferreolus and Ferrutio (Ferréol et Ferjeux).

External links

 Diocèse de Besançon

Burials
Saints Ferreolus and Ferrutio 

Buildings and structures in Besançon
Saint Ferjeux
Saint Ferjeux
Roman Catholic churches in Besançon
Tourist attractions in Besançon